Paul Marie Viollet (24 October 1840, Tours, France22 November 1914, Paris) was a French historian.

Life
After serving his native city as secretary and archivist, he became archivist at the Archives impériales in Paris in 1866, and later librarian to the faculty of law. On June 7, 1890 he was appointed professor of civil and canon law at the École des chartes. His work mainly concerned the history of law and institutions, and on this subject he published two scholarly books Droit public: Histoire des institutions politiques et administratives de la France (1890–98), and Précis de l'histoire du droit français (1886).

References

Attribution:

Further reading
Vincent Duclert, Colloque du général de Gaulle, Lille 2001.
Eugène Viollet, Paul Viollet, mon père, manuscript, 1926.

External links
 Online exhibition Paul Viollet 1840-1914 "un grand savant assoiffé de justice" published by Cujas Library.
 

1840 births
1914 deaths
Members of the Académie des Inscriptions et Belles-Lettres
French archivists
19th-century French historians
French librarians
École Nationale des Chartes alumni
French male non-fiction writers